is a Japanese football player.

Playing career
Kurakawa was born in Sanyo-Onoda on August 10, 1977. After graduating from Aichi Gakuin University, he joined J1 League club Yokohama F. Marinos in 2000. However he could not play at all in the match. In 2001, he moved to Prefectural Leagues club Gunma FC Horikoshi (later FC Horikoshi). The club was promoted to Regional Leagues from 2002 and Japan Football League from 2004. He played many matches as regular player until 2005. In 2006, he moved to J2 League club Kashiwa Reysol. He became a regular player as right side back in late 2006 and the club was promoted to J1 from 2007. In 2008, the club won the 2nd place Emperor's Cup.

However his opportunity to play decreased from 2009 and the club was relegated to J2 from 2010. Although the club returned to J1 in a year and won the champions in 2011 J1 League, he could hardly play in the match in 2011. In 2012, he moved to J2 club Roasso Kumamoto. He became a regular player as right side back in 2012. Although his opportunity to play decreased a little from 2013, he played many matches until 2016. In 2017, he moved to Regional Leagues club Suzuka Unlimited FC. He retired end of 2018 season.

Coaching career
In September 2017, when Kurakawa played for Regional Leagues club Suzuka Unlimited FC, he became a playing manager. He managed the club until end of 2017 season.

Club statistics
Updated to 1 January 2019.

References

External links

1977 births
Living people
Aichi Gakuin University alumni
Association football people from Yamaguchi Prefecture
Japanese footballers
J1 League players
J2 League players
Japan Football League players
Yokohama F. Marinos players
Arte Takasaki players
Kashiwa Reysol players
Roasso Kumamoto players
Suzuka Point Getters players
Association football defenders